John Howard Appleton (February 3, 1844 – February 18, 1930) was an American chemist.

Appleton was born in Portland, Maine, February 3, 1844. He was graduated at Brown University with bachelor of philosophy degree in 1863, the following year became instructor in chemistry there, and in 1868 was elected professor of chemistry and applied arts which he held till his mandatory retirement at the age of 70 in 1914. He was  State Sealer of Weights and Measures and also chemist for the State Board of Agriculture. He was a fellow of the American Association for the Advancement of Science and was named an honorary member of the American Institute of Chemistry in 1928. He died in Providence, Rhode Island on February 18, 1930. Appleton wrote 12 books on chemistry. They include “The Young Chemist” (Philadelphia, 1878); “Qualitative Analysis” (1878); “Quantitative Analysis” (1881); and “Chemistry of Non-Metals” (Providence, 1884).

Notes

References

External links
 

1844 births
1930 deaths
Appleton family
19th-century American scientists
American chemists
Brown University alumni
Brown University faculty
Academics from Portland, Maine
Scientists from Maine